Jonestown: The Power and The Myth of Alan Jones is a 2006 biography of radio personality Alan Jones by Chris Masters. The biography deals in part with Jones's sexuality; Masters asserts that Jones is homosexual, something that Jones does not self-identify as. Masters began Jonestown in 2002 after profiling Jones for an episode of the current affairs program Four Corners.

Awards and nominations

Nominations

The book was nominated for the 2006 Douglas Stewart Prize for Non-Fiction for its "depth of research, fluency of narrative and professional engagement".

Awards

The book won the Australian Book Industry Award for Australian Biography of the Year 2007.

Controversy
ABC Enterprises announced on 29 June 2006 that it was cancelling the publication of Masters' manuscript; ABC Enterprises director Robyn Watts stated that this was because it would "almost certainly result in commercial loss, which would be irresponsible". This statement was widely believed to be a veiled reference to the fact that Jones's lawyers had threatened an expensive defamation lawsuit if the book reached publication. ABC program Media Watch reported that the decision to cancel publication had been made not by ABC Enterprises but by the ABC Board. Many ABC personalities criticised the Board's decision, and a petition against the decision circulated, with signatories including ABC radio personalities Richard Glover and Phillip Adams.

Mike Carlton, Jones's rival Sydney radio broadcaster, suggested on 2UE in his show on 5 July 2006 that the book might detail homosexual encounters on Jones's part and Jones's lawyers had told the ABC that Masters' materials were "replete with false and inappropriate sexual innuendo".

In the introduction to Jonestown, Masters described Jones as having concealed his sexuality "more for the sake of preserving a dishonest power base" than for reasons of personal privacy, an explanation he repeated later when accused of being motivated by prurience. Additionally, Masters says that Jones's attempt to mask his sexuality is a defining feature of his personality and provides an explanation for many aspects of his behaviour. In the book's final chapter, Masters quotes a study performed by Roy Morgan Research that reported that "46% of [Jones's] listeners believe that homosexuality is immoral, compared to 35% of all Australians." Masters' attempts to explain so much about Jones by reference to his sexuality caused the commentator Miranda Devine to see his book as homophobic.

The ABC's decision not to publish the book delayed its release by less than three months; publisher Allen & Unwin Australia released it in October 2006. The book sold 12,700 copies and earned almost A$600,000 in its first six days after publication—placing it at the top of the bestseller list for its category.

On 20 October 2006, The Sydney Morning Herald published a seven-page edited extract of Jonestown. The extract, with italicised links by former Media Watch host and author David Marr, concentrated mainly on the claims that Jones was homosexual, his behaviour while the senior English master at The King's School at Parramatta in Sydney and an alleged "cottaging" incident in London. The lead paragraph sets out Masters' claim that the masking of his homosexuality is "a defining feature of the Jones persona".

In a bizarre incident on 4 November 2006 a hard cover copy of the book (initially mistakenly reported to be a rock) was dropped from a Melbourne freeway overpass onto Alan Jones' car, smashing the front windscreen.

The Chaser claimed to have a signed copy of Jonestown, which they claimed to be "probably the only signed copy of Jonestown by Alan Jones", and Julian Morrow stated on The Chaser's War on Everything that they intended to "auction it off to raise money for troubled homosexuals". In the Season 2 DVD Commentary track, Morrow and Craig Reucassel confirmed the book was further signed by Chris Masters and was sold at auction with the proceeds given to a child cancer charity.

In a sharply critical review published in The Australian, David Flint says that "Masters is entitled to investigate and challenge Jones's influence and role, but he is not entitled to intrude into his private life based on purloined correspondence, amateur psychoanalysis and irresponsible journalism. No wonder the ABC board wrote off the public money poured into this vengeful project by the nomenklatura. The result is no credit to its author, its publishers and the two newspapers that featured the most salacious bits." Flint, a right-wing commentator and monarchist, is the author of a book castigating the left in which "only the gay movement is spared approbation".

External links
 Chris Masters' reply to critics The author defends criticism of the book, in an editorial in The Australian newspaper. DEAD link...

References

2006 non-fiction books
Australian biographies
Non-fiction books about same-sex sexuality
LGBT-related controversies in literature